Khour Deonia is a town, near the city of Jammu in Jammu district in the Indian union territory of Jammu and Kashmir.The town is named after a Rajput Clan Deonia who are settled here for many decades.

Geography
It has an average elevation of 279 metres (915 feet). It is located on right bank of famous Chhanab at a distance of about 3 km.

Demographics
 India census, Khour Deonia had a population of 2480 with 547 no of households. Males constitute 53.5% of the population and females 46.5%. Khour Deonia has an average literacy rate of 71%, higher than the national average of 59.5%: male literacy is 56.3%, and female literacy is 43.7%. In Khour Deonia, 11% of the population is under 6 years of age.

References

Cities and towns in Jammu district